Useless Humans is a 2020 American independent sci-fi horror comedy film directed by Stephen Ohl and starring Josh Zuckerman, Davida Williams, Luke Youngblood, Rushi Kota, Edy Ganem, Maya Kazan, Joey Kern, Iqbal Theba, Tim DeZarn and Kevin Michael Martin.

Plot
Brian (Josh Zuckerman) and his three degenerate friends (Davida Williams, Luke Youngblood, Rushi Kota) must save the world when a ruthless monstrous alien crashes his 30th birthday party.

Cast
Josh Zuckerman as Brian
Davida Williams as Jess
Luke Youngblood as Alex
Rushi Kota as Louis
Edy Ganem as Chum
Maya Kazan as Wendy
Joey Kern as Zachary
Iqbal Theba as Kenneth
Tim DeZarn as Tim DeZarn
Kevin Michael Martin as Kevin Michael Martin

Reception
Alex Saveliev of Film Threat said the film "is not devoid of merit, but neither is it good enough to recommend". Russ Simmons of KKFI opined that "it's goofy midnight movie fodder that never quite delivers the laughs it had hoped for".

On the other hand, Amanda Mazzillo of Film Inquiry gave a positive review, concluding that the "very aspect of Useless Humans aims to affectionately recall films of the past while maintaining a perfectly modern tone with its comedy, twists, and characters".

References

External links
 
 

American independent films
2020 independent films
2020 science fiction horror films
2020 comedy horror films
American science fiction horror films
American comedy horror films
2020s English-language films
2020s American films